Rina Morelli (6 December 1908 – 17 July 1976) was an Italian film and stage actress. She appeared in 34 films between 1939 and 1976. She was born in Naples, Italy and died in Rome, Italy. Her husband, Paolo Stoppa, was an Italian stage and film actor, as well as a renowned Italian language dubber for American film stars.

Selected filmography

 An Adventure of Salvator Rosa (1939) - The duchess Isabella di Torniano
 The Iron Crown (1941) - Old woman with the spindle
 Yes, Madam (1942) - Suor Valeria
 Fedora (1942) - Olga Soukarev
 Don Julio (1942) - Socorrito
 Maria Malibran (1943) - Angelina
 Il nostro prossimo (1943) - The parson's housekeeper
 Gli assi della risata (1943) - Maid (segment "L'ombrello smarrito") (uncredited)
 Quartetto pazzo (1945) - Monica
 What a Distinguished Family (1945) - Patrizia
 Black Eagle (1946) - Irina
 Fabiola (1949) - Faustina
 The Forbidden Christ (1951) - Mother Baldi
 In Olden Days (1952) - Guido's mother (segment "L"idillio")
 The Return of Don Camillo (1953) - Bit part (uncredited)
 100 Years of Love (1954) - Maria Bianchi (segment "Nozze d'Oro")
 Senso (1954) - Laura, the housekeeper
 Eighteen Year Olds (1955) - Signora La Rovere
 Andrea Chénier (1955) - Mother of Chénier
 The Intruder (1956) - Rosa
 Città di notte (1958) - Signora Prandi
 Gli zitelloni (1958) - Adalgisa
 Il bell'Antonio (1960) - Rosaria Magnano
 Toto, Fabrizi and the Young People Today (1960) - Teresa D'Amore
 The Joy of Living (1961) - Rosa Fossati
 The Lovemakers (1961) - (uncredited)
 Le Crime ne paie pas (1962) - Teresa - the confidant (segment "Le masque")
 The Shortest Day (1963) - Mother of Dino (uncredited)
 The Leopard (1963) - Princess Maria Stella Salina
 L'albero dalle foglie rosa (1974) - The grandmother
 Drama of the Rich (1974) - Giannina Murri
 L'Innocente (1976) - Tullio's Mother

References

External links

1908 births
1976 deaths
Actresses from Naples
Italian film actresses
Italian voice actresses
Italian stage actresses
20th-century Italian actresses